The Billboard Music Award winners for Top Male Artist. Drake (3) and Justin Bieber (2) are the only artists to win this award multiple times.

Winners and nominees

Superlatives

The following individuals received two or more Top Male Artist Awards:

The following individuals received two or more Top Male Artist nominations:

References

Billboard awards